Mark Wasyliw is a Canadian politician, who was elected to the Legislative Assembly of Manitoba in the 2019 Manitoba general election. He represents the electoral district of Fort Garry as a member of the New Democratic Party of Manitoba.

References

New Democratic Party of Manitoba MLAs
Living people
Politicians from Winnipeg
21st-century Canadian politicians
Year of birth missing (living people)